The Porta Saragozza of Bologna was one of the gates or portals in the medieval walls of this city.

The gate was built in the 13-14th centuries, and by 1334 it was provided with a drawbridge crossing a moat. It was not used much until 1674, when the long Portico di San Luca was built from the center of town to the Basilica della Beata Vergine di San Luca, used in yearly procession of an icon. From then on it became also known as the “Porta Sacra” or the “Porta dei pellegrini” (Holy Gate and Gate of Pilgrims) for its placement in the route towards the Sanctuary of San Luca.

In 1859, concordant with a rising movement to restore medieval remnants in Italian cities, the architect Giuseppe Mengoli, replaced the mediaeval cassero with the present one by connecting it with two crenellated arches to the two lateral cylindrical great towers, giving it its present castle-like form.

About nine of the original twelve gates remain in the third set of circumvallating 14th-century walls (Cerchia del Mille) of Bologna. These include the Porta Maggiore (or Mazzini), Porta Castiglione, Porta Saragozza (this article), Porta San Felice, Porta delle Lame, Porta Galliera, Porta Mascarella, Porta San Donato, and Porta San Vitale.

References

Buildings and structures completed in the 14th century